Smuggler's Run is a video game developed by Angel Studios and published by Rockstar Games as a launch title for the PlayStation 2 on October 26, 2000. In the game, the player plays as a smuggler who has a number of different vehicles at his disposal including dune buggies, rally cars, and military vehicles. The vehicles are used to smuggle assorted cargo through three different large, open levels. The game, which was an early release for the Sony PlayStation 2, features career and 1- to 2-player arcade modes.

Smuggler's Run became a part of the Sony Greatest Hits series of games that reached a particular sales milestone for the PlayStation 2.

Gameplay
Smuggler's Mission:
New to a local smuggling gang, the player's job is to smuggle cargo through three consecutive levels (forest, desert, and snow) with about ten missions per level. In nearly all missions they must evade the U.S. border patrol, the CIA, or rival smuggling gangs. This is basically the career mode of the game. There are a total of 34 missions to complete in this mode.

Turf War:
In the turf war mode, players can play three different mini-games, two of which involve smuggling cargo while fighting against a rival gang. The final mini-game is a race through a popular spot through the level of their choice.

Joyriding:
Joyriding mode is basically a free roam mode where the player can explore the level of their choice without having to evade the border patrol. This is a good way to become familiar with the levels and find a quick way through the level during Smuggler's Mission.

Reception

The PlayStation 2 version received "generally favorable reviews", while the Game Boy Advance version received "generally unfavorable reviews", according to the review aggregation website Metacritic. David Chen of NextGen said of the former console version, "A truly next-generation launch title, it's fast, fun, and free of constraints – just the way we like our cross-country crime sprees." In Japan, where the same console version was ported for release under the name  and published by Syscom on December 28, 2000, Famitsu gave it a score of 28 out of 40.

GamePro said of the PlayStation 2 version, "Smuggler's Runs go-anywhere experience frees you up to get a bit creative with your driving, and the high speeds combined with rugged off-road courses make for a wild ride." Edge gave the same console version a score of six out of ten, saying that it "smacks of a game which has had a great deal of effort expended on its physics engine and raw playability, but very little on drawing up an overarching design."

Sequel

A sequel to the game was produced: Smuggler's Run 2, which was released for the Sony PlayStation 2 on October 30, 2001. The sequel was later ported to the GameCube on August 7, 2002 and renamed Smuggler's Run: Warzones.

Notes

References

External links

2000 video games
Game Boy Advance games
PlayStation 2 games
Racing video games
Rockstar Games games
Take-Two Interactive games
Take-Two Interactive franchises
Rockstar Games franchises
Destination Software games
Video games developed in the United States
Multiplayer and single-player video games